Alexandre Jacques François Bertrand (25 April 1795 – 22 January 1831) was a French physician and mesmerist who was a native of Rennes. He was the father of archaeologist Alexandre Bertrand (1820–1902) and mathematician Joseph Bertrand (1822–1900). He was also an ally of philosopher Pierre Leroux (1798–1871) and the Saint-Simonians.

Bertrand is remembered for his scientific investigations of animal magnetism and somnambulism. In his public lectures on animal magnetism he spoke confidently about the existence of "magnetic fluid", but through experience and reflection he later changed his mind, becoming a leading critic of its existence.

From 1825 to 1830 Bertrand published numerous articles in the progressive journal Le Globe.

Selected writings 

 Traité du somnambulisme et des différentes modifications qu'il présente (Treatise on sleepwalking and the various changes it presents), Paris, Dentu, 1823.  
 
 
 Lettres sur la physique, Paris, Bossange frères, 1824 and 1825. 
 De l'extase (Of Ecstasy), Paris, 1826. 
 Du magnétisme en France et des jugements qu'en ont porté les sociétés savantes (Of magnetism in France and judgments of the learned societies), Paris, Baillière, 1826.- Republication L'Harmattan, 2004 - .

References
This article is based on a translation of an equivalent article at the French Wikipedia.

External links
  
Lettres sur les révolutions du globe (1824); Lettres sur les révolutions du globe (1826) - digital facsimiles from Linda Hall Library

1795 births
1831 deaths
Physicians from Rennes
19th-century French physicians
19th-century French male writers
French medical writers
French male non-fiction writers